Haithem Abid (born 22 September 1965) is a Tunisian footballer who played as a midfielder. He competed in the 1988 Summer Olympics.

References

1965 births
Living people
Footballers at the 1988 Summer Olympics
Tunisian footballers
Association football midfielders
Olympic footballers of Tunisia
Espérance Sportive de Tunis players
Tunisian Ligue Professionnelle 1 players